Pétervására is a district created in 2013 in the north-western part of Heves County. Pétervására is also the name of the town where the district seat is found. The district is located in the Northern Hungary Statistical Region.

Geography 
Pétervására District borders with Salgótarján District (Nógrád County) and Ózd District (Borsod-Abaúj-Zemplén County) to the north, Bélapátfalva District and Eger District to the east, Gyöngyös District to the south, Bátonyterenye District (Nógrád County) to the west. The number of the inhabited places in Pétervására District is 20.

Municipalities 
The district has 1 town, 2 large villages and 17 villages.
(ordered by population, as of 1 January 2012)

The bolded municipality is city, italics municipalities are large villages.

Demographics

In 2011, it had a population of 21,433 and the population density was 50/km².

Ethnicity
Besides the Hungarian majority, the main minority is the Roma (approx. 2,500).

Total population (2011 census): 21,433
Ethnic groups (2011 census): Identified themselves: 21,622 persons:
Hungarians: 18,794 (86.92%)
Gypsies: 2,559 (11.84%)
Others and indefinable: 269 (1.24%)
Approx. 200 persons in Pétervására District did declare more than one ethnic group at the 2011 census.

Religion
Religious adherence in the county according to 2011 census:

Catholic – 13,941 (Roman Catholic – 13,870; Greek Catholic – 68);
Reformed – 467;
Evangelical – 60; 
other religions – 519; 
Non-religious – 1,929; 
Atheism – 137;
Undeclared – 4,380.

Gallery

See also
List of cities and towns of Hungary

References

External links
 Postal codes of the Pétervására District

Districts in Heves County